The Centre for the Talented Youth (Ireland) (CTY Ireland) is a youth programme for students between the ages of six and seventeen of high academic ability in Ireland, run by Dr. Colm O'Reilly.

There are sibling projects around the world, most notably the CTY programme at Johns Hopkins University, the original model for CTY Ireland. CTY students are eligible to participate in CTY's summer sessions for older students. CTY was founded in 1992, with its first summer programme running in 1993, and is based at Dublin City University in Glasnevin, Dublin 9. The centre offers various courses for gifted students as well as conducting research and promoting the needs of the talented in Ireland.

Currently, it caters for 5,000 students a year

Eligibility 
Eligibility for CTY's programmes is based on scores in the School and College Ability Test. Students who score within the top 5th percentile are eligible for the CTY programmes, and those who score within the top 10th percentile are eligible for the CAT programmes. Students who score within the top 15th percentile are eligible for the Summer Scholars program.

CTY also allows for bright and motivated students to partake in courses such as the correspondence course, and scholarships can be attained for EUE or the secondary school summer programme. Students can also attend on a psychologist's recommendation.

Primary School Programmes 
Saturday courses are offered for Primary School students at various colleges and institutes of technology around Ireland throughout the year. There are courses for both the 6–7 age group and the 8–13 group. DCU also run classes on Wednesday afternoons.

Secondary School Programmes
A summer programme for 12–17 year-olds (1st – 5th Year) as part of CAT or CTY runs only at DCU. These courses give students the opportunity to study college-style and college levelled courses intensively for three weeks in the summer in one of two sessions, each of which lasts three weeks.

Because of the Irish financial situation up until recently, fewer people were been able to afford the steep cost of the programme, especially since the Government cut CTYI's funding in 2009. Since, students can now attend both sessions of the course, and the age bracket has been increased to include up to age seventeen.

Some of the students at the summer programme come from overseas, mostly from continental countries such as Spain, Portugal, and Italy. Owing to the intensive nature of the programme, most of the 190–250 students who attend each session are residential, living in student accommodation for the duration of the course. However, students can also commute, attending the course as the residential students do but going home at the end of the day and returning in the morning.

In 2018, the following courses were offered;

 Biomedical Engineering
 Clinical Psychology
 Child Psychology 
 Computer Gaming
 Game Theory
 International Relations
 Japanese Language and Culture
 Law
 Medicine
 Neuroscience
 Novel Writing
 Robotics
 Theoretical Physics
 Maths Experience
 Computer Animation
 Criminology
 Film Studies
 Genetics & Cell Biology
 Marine Biology
 Philosophy
 Sci-Fi & Fantasy Writing
 Sports Science
 Radio, TV, & Digital Communications
Moot Court
Note that the CAT (85th to 95th percentile) version of the program ends after two weeks and so has a slightly different course matter.

Weekdays in the summer programme are highly structured. Classes run from 9am to 3pm, with an hour's break for lunch. Activities take place from 3.15pm to 5pm, supervised by the residential assistants (RAs). Between 5pm and 6:30pm students have dinner and are required to attend a meeting with their RA group. 6:30pm to 8:30pm is taken up by the study period, which is supervised by the teaching assistant. Social time takes place between 8:30pm and 10pm, with lights-out at 10.30pm.

On weekends, social activities such as discos, shopping trips, visits to the cinema, excursions to various interesting sights in Ireland, talent shows, mock casino nights and so on are organised.

Early University Entrance
EUE is a programme for Transition Year students in secondary school. Like the summer programme, it runs on DCU's campus, with students covering two modules (equivalent to what a first year college student in DCU would study) over a school semester, one day a week each week (usually Fridays). In 2018 subjects included Law & Politics, Business, Engineering, and Psychology. EUE is open to CAT and CTY qualifying students.

Other courses
The centre runs correspondence courses throughout the year for 12- to 16-year-olds and also for Transition Year students who do not have to fulfil any aptitude test requirements. Courses include or have included Writing By Mail, Journalism, Psychology, Philosophy, Legal Studies, and Science of Tomorrow. There are also correspondence courses for younger students (8–13) in computing-related subjects and Writing By Mail.

Permanent staff
Dr. Colm O'Reilly – Director

Dr. Catriona Ledwith – Assistant Director

Dr. Leeanne Hinch – Academic Coordinator

Ms. Orla Dunne – Residential Coordinator

Ms. Lynne Mooney – Young Student Manager

Ms. Linda Murphy – Post-Primary Manager			

Ms. Ruth Lally- Post-Primary Administrator	

Ms. Emily Daly – Assistant Academic Coordinator

Other staff

As the on-site programmes available for students are part-time and/or short-term, most of the staff associated with these programmes are contracted for a set period of time. Residential staff are hired for either 3 or 6 weeks (summer programme only) while academic staff are hired for 3 weeks, 6 weeks, or on a part-time basis during the year (e.g. an eight-week Saturday course).

Assistant Residential Coordinators (ARCs)
These staff (usually 2, 1 male and 1 female) are responsible for the care of the students at CTYI during the 12–17 summer courses. They live in the residences with the students and are the highest-ranking staff members when the Residential Coordinator is absent (e.g., at night). They are in charge of the RAs also. ARCs are often ex-RAs, who return to hold a higher point of authority. An ARC may hold the position for a number of years running, e.g. former ARC Mary Heslin held the position for 4 years running.

Residential Assistants (RAs)
RAs are responsible for the care their RA group (normally a group of 18–22 students) and they report to the ARCs. Any residential students will bring up issues with their RAs. They may also act as mentors to the students if they are having problems settling in. Typically there is a mix between former CTYI students and those who have not attended the programme.

Instructors
Instructors are generally professionals or postgraduate students who are willing to give up 3 weeks of a year to work with CTYI's students. They are hired on the basis of specialist knowledge in a particular field and a rapport with young people. Some are former CTYI students and/or have worked on the programme as RAs or TAs. In the past they have included lecturers at DCU, but stricter regulations within the university now prohibit DCU staff from taking on 'a second contract'.

Teaching Assistant (TA)
A TA's primary function is to assist the instructor during class time and supervision and assisting students during study period.

Coordinator
On the part-time programmes during the year, additional administrative staff are hired to co-ordinate Saturday programmes.

2009 Cut in Funding
It was announced in the post-crash 2009 Irish budget that the government would not continue funding CTYI. Up to 2008 the Department of Education had been providing the course with €97,000. The move was criticised by CTYI staff. However a spokesperson for the Department of Education said that "the resources available for next year meant that difficult choices had to be made and the abolition of the grant to the Centre for Talented Youth was one of those tough decisions." The government had planned to allow CTYI to become a national mandate.

See also
CTY
Dublin City University
Transition Year 
SCAT

References 

http://www.irishtimes.com/newspaper/features/2009/0311/1224242651684.html
http://talesofthequad.wikia.com/wiki/Tales_Of_The_Quad_-_All_Things_CTYI_Wiki A wiki made by CTYI students

External links
Irish Centre for Talented Youth Home Page
Tales of the Quad – an unofficial CTYI wiki, run and maintained by students

Summer camps in Ireland
Gifted education
Education in the Republic of Ireland
Dublin City University
1992 establishments in Ireland